Roadsong is an album by guitarist Vic Juris recorded in 1977 and released on the Muse label.

Reception

AllMusic awarded the album 4 stars with its review by Scott Yanow noting that "guitarist Vic Juris performs fusion-oriented music during this recording...despite some fiery solos from the leader, the overall results are not particularly memorable and sound very much of the period".

Track listing 
All compositions by Vic Juris except where noted
 "Roadsong" (Wes Montgomery) – 5:47
 "Portabelo Market" – 7:23
 "Leah" – 4:45
 "Vic's Theme" (Terry Silverlight) – 3:27 
 "In Between" – 4:01
 "One for Sonny" – 4:52
 "Free Bird" – 4:53
 "Two Lovely People" – 5:28

Personnel 
Vic Juris – guitar
Richie Cole – alto saxophone (tracks 5 & 9) 
Barry Miles – keyboards
Rick Laird (tracks 1, 2 & 4-8), Jon Burr (track 3) – bass
Terry Silverlight – drums

References 

Vic Juris albums
1978 albums
Muse Records albums
Albums recorded at Van Gelder Studio